The 1944 Delaware gubernatorial election was held on November 7, 1944.

Incumbent Republican Governor Walter W. Bacon defeated Democratic nominee Isaac J. MacCollum with 50.52% of the vote.

Nominations
Nominations were made by party conventions.

Democratic nomination
The Democratic convention was held on August 22 at Dover.

Candidate
Isaac J. MacCollum, incumbent Lieutenant Governor

Republican nomination
The Republican convention was held on July 19 at Dover.

Candidate
Walter W. Bacon, incumbent Governor, nominated unopposed

General election

References

Bibliography
 
 

1944
Delaware
Gubernatorial
November 1944 events